Mary O. Boyle (born December 23, 1941) is an American politician of the Ohio Democratic party.

Boyle started her career in elective office as a state legislator representing Cleveland Heights (Ohio District #9) in 1978. She was Elected Majority Whip in the Ohio House of Representatives in 1982. Following that, she served on the Board of County Commissioners of Cuyahoga County, Ohio, for twelve years. She was the first woman ever elected to a non-judicial county office in Cuyahoga County. She is married to the former Vice-President of Cleveland State, Jack Boyle.

Boyle was a candidate for the United States Senate in 1994, to replace the retiring Howard Metzenbaum, but she was defeated in the Democratic primary by Joel Hyatt. Republican Mike DeWine eventually was elected to the Senate seat in November 1994. In 1998, she was the Democratic nominee for U.S. Senate to replace the retiring John Glenn. She was defeated by then-Ohio Governor George Voinovich. She was the first (and still only) woman nominated by a major party for the Senate from Ohio. Boyle also ran for Treasurer of State in 2002 against Joseph T. Deters, which she lost.

Boyle is the mother of Ohio politician Jim Boyle and three other children: Catherine Boyle, John Boyle, and Peter Boyle.

References

External links
Profile on the Ohio Ladies' Gallery website

|-

1941 births
20th-century American politicians
20th-century American women politicians
21st-century American politicians
21st-century American women politicians
Candidates in the 1998 United States elections
Candidates in the 2002 United States elections
County commissioners in Ohio
Living people
Democratic Party members of the Ohio House of Representatives
Politicians from Cleveland
Women state legislators in Ohio